Marie-Christine Roussy (born 1 March 1983) is a Canadian table tennis player. She competed at the 2000 Summer Olympics and the 2004 Summer Olympics.

References

External links
 

1983 births
Living people
Canadian female table tennis players
Olympic table tennis players of Canada
Table tennis players at the 2000 Summer Olympics
Table tennis players at the 2004 Summer Olympics
People from Repentigny, Quebec
Sportspeople from Quebec
Commonwealth Games medallists in table tennis
Commonwealth Games bronze medallists for Canada
Table tennis players at the 2002 Commonwealth Games
Medallists at the 2002 Commonwealth Games